Hypotarzetta is a genus of fungi in the family Pyronemataceae. It is monotypic, containing the single species Hypotarzetta insignis.

Pyronemataceae
Monotypic Ascomycota genera